Abdullah bin Ya'kub is a Malaysian politician and currently serves as Speaker of the Kelantan State Legislative Assembly.

Election Results

Honours
  :
  Knight Commander of the Order of the Life of the Crown of Kelantan (DJMK) -  Dato' (2013)

References

Malaysian Islamic Party politicians
Members of the Kelantan State Legislative Assembly
Kelantan state executive councillors
21st-century Malaysian politicians
Living people
Year of birth missing (living people)
People from Kelantan
Malaysian people of Malay descent
Malaysian Muslims